Port Royal Speedway is a half-mile dirt racetrack in Port Royal, Juniata County, Pennsylvania in the United States. It was opened on September 10, 1938.

History
Like all of the tracks in the United States, it closed during the World War II years (1941–1945) and re-opened in 1946. Port Royal Speedway hosts a weekly schedule of local Sprint Car, Late Model, and Pro-Stock dirt track racing, and is nicknamed "The Speed Palace". Several national touring series organizations visit the track during the racing season, including the World of Outlaws Late Model Series and the All Star Circuit of Champions. Port Royal Speedway is the host of the Juniata County Fair.

Port Royal Sprint Car Track Champions

Tuscarora 50 Winners

References

External links

 Port Royal Speedway Race Driver Photos
Website: 

Dirt oval race tracks in the United States
Motorsport venues in Pennsylvania
Tourist attractions in Juniata County, Pennsylvania
Buildings and structures in Juniata County, Pennsylvania